Old Ngomeni was a Swahili settlement on the coast of Kenya between the 5th and 13th centuries. It continued as a harbour into the 16th century.

According to the Book of the Zanj, Nogmeni was founded by the king of Himyar, Abu Karib, who reigned in AD 390–420. It was built on the north side of Sheshale Point and the Sabaki river in an area of saltwater lagoons. Its major product was mangroves. It was overtaken by the sea in the 13th century. It lay south of the cape known today as Ras Ngomeni. As of 1961, only a house remained of the original town. It is the site of the Broglio Space Center, which belongs to Italy.

In 2007, a Portuguese shipwreck was discovered off Ngomeni. It dates to 1500–1550, making it the oldest shipwreck yet found in sub-Saharan Africa.

See also
Maritime archaeology of East Africa

References

Swahili people
Former populated places in Kenya
Populated places established in the 5th century
13th-century disestablishments in Africa